Jaime Jefferson Guilarte (born 17 January 1962) is a retired Cuban long jumper. A predecessor of the greatest Cuban long jumper, Ivan Pedroso, he was also capable of big jumps, taking more international medals in a career that spanned for over a decade.

Career
His first notable success were 1983 Pan-American Games in Caracas where he won the gold. Jefferson improved his long jump personal best to 8.37m in 1984, but was deprived of competing at the L.A. Olympics through Cuban boycott. Over the next decade and a half, he amassed several medals from Central American Games and Championships, winning the golds at Champs in 1985 and CAC Games in 1986. Jaime also won two golds at World University Games - first in Kobe in 1985, second in Duisburg in 1989. At the Pan-American Games in Indianapolis in 1987, he improved his PB to 8.51m to collect bronze medal behind Carl Lewis and Larry Myricks (both USA), but couldn't reproduce that at the World Championships in Rome finishing 6th with 8.14m. 1988 was again frustrating because of another Olympic Cuban boycott, but Jaime continued to compete with even more success in 90's. He recorded his career best long jump of 8.53m in 1990 and had great season in 1991, winning silver at the World Indoor Championships in Seville and reclaiming Pan-American title he lost in 1987, winning in his home country in Havana with 8.26m. Only disappointment of the season was subpar 9th-place finish in the greatest long jump competition ever, World Championships in Tokyo. Next season finally brought Jefferson's first Olympic appearance and he finished creditable 5th in Barcelona, again behind great Carl Lewis. Jaime added World Indoor bronze in 1993 at Toronto, but his career was obviously on the wane in his thirties as he was unable to qualify for the final in major outings 1993 and 1995 World Championships and 1996 Olympic Games in Atlanta. Jaime Jefferson won his final international medal at 1997 CAC Championships in San Juan where he finished behind his famous compatriot Ivan Pedroso, by then World's finest long jumper, and retired at the end of the season.

International competitions

1Representing the Americas

References

Cuban male long jumpers
Athletes (track and field) at the 1983 Pan American Games
Athletes (track and field) at the 1987 Pan American Games
Athletes (track and field) at the 1991 Pan American Games
Athletes (track and field) at the 1992 Summer Olympics
Athletes (track and field) at the 1995 Pan American Games
Athletes (track and field) at the 1996 Summer Olympics
Olympic athletes of Cuba
Sportspeople from Guantánamo
1962 births
Living people
Pan American Games gold medalists for Cuba
Pan American Games medalists in athletics (track and field)
World Athletics Championships athletes for Cuba
Universiade medalists in athletics (track and field)
Central American and Caribbean Games gold medalists for Cuba
Competitors at the 1986 Central American and Caribbean Games
Competitors at the 1990 Central American and Caribbean Games
Competitors at the 1993 Central American and Caribbean Games
Universiade gold medalists for Cuba
Central American and Caribbean Games medalists in athletics
Medalists at the 1985 Summer Universiade
Medalists at the 1989 Summer Universiade
Competitors at the 1990 Goodwill Games
Medalists at the 1983 Pan American Games
Medalists at the 1987 Pan American Games
Medalists at the 1991 Pan American Games
Medalists at the 1995 Pan American Games
Friendship Games medalists in athletics